The following is a list of important sites of interest in and around the city of Los Angeles.



0–9 
 5900 Wilshire
 777 Tower

A 

 Ahmanson Theatre
 Alex Theatre (Glendale)
 All Saints Episcopal Church
 Alvarado Terrace Historic District *
 Andalusia *
 Angelino Heights
 Angels Flight (Downtown Los Angeles)
 Angelus Funeral Home *
 Angelus Temple *
 Antelope Valley California Poppy Reserve
 The Apple Pan
 Aquarium of the Pacific
 Arroyo Seco
 Arroyo Seco Parkway
 Art Center College of Design (Pasadena)
 Autry National Center

B 

 Backbone Trail
 Baldwin Hills Village *
 Ballona Creek
 Banning House *
 Banc of California Stadium
 Barney's Beanery
 Barnsdall Art Park
 Battleship Iowa Museum (San Pedro)
 The Belmont Tunnel
 Bergamot Station
 Beverly Gardens Park
 Beverly Hills Hotel
 Beverly Wilshire Hotel *
 Big Tujunga Dam
 Biltmore Hotel
 Biola University
 Biscuit Company Lofts
 Bob Baker Marionette Theater
 Bolton Hall *
 Bonaventure Hotel (Downtown)
 Boyle Heights
 Bradbury Building * (Downtown)
 Breed Street Shul *
 Broadway Theater District
 Bryson Apartment Hotel *
 Bullocks Wilshire *
 The Bunny Museum
 Burbank City Hall *
 Burro Flats Painted Cave

C 

 Cabrillo Beach
 Cabrillo Marine Aquarium
 California African American Museum
 California Club *
 California Institute of the Arts (CalArts)
 California Institute of Technology (Caltech)
 California Science Center
 Campo de Cahuenga *
 Canter's
 Capitol Records Building
 Carroll Avenue *
 Casa de Rosas *
 Case Study Houses
 Cathedral of Our Lady of the Angels
 Cathedral of Saint Vibiana
 CBS Studios (Studio City)
 Celebration Theatre
 Central Avenue
 Central Los Angeles Library (Downtown)
 Chain Reaction
 Château Élysée
 Chateau Marmont
 Chavez Ravine Arboretum
 Chemosphere
 Chicken Boy
 Chinatown (Downtown)
 Chinese American Museum
 Chinese Cemetery of Los Angeles
 Chips Coffee Shop
 The Church On the Way
 Cinerama Dome
 Clark House
 Clark Library
 Clifton's Cafeteria
 Coca-Cola Building
 Cole's Pacific Electric Buffet
 Colorado Street Bridge (Pasadena) *
 Constance Perkins House
 Convento Building *
 Corky's
 Craft Contemporary
 Crenshaw
 Crossroads of the World

D 

 Descanso Gardens
 Destination Crenshaw
 Disneyland (Anaheim)
 Dockweiler State Beach
 Dodger Stadium (Chavez Ravine)
 Dolby Theatre (Hollywood)
 Dominguez Rancho Adobe *
 Double Ascension
 Drum Barracks *
 Dunbar Hotel *
 Dignity Health Sports Park *

E 

 Eagle Rock
 Eagle Rock Community Cultural Center *
 Eames House
 Ebell of Los Angeles *
 The Echo
 Echo Park
 El Escorpión Park
 El Pino
 El Rey Theatre
 Electric Fountain
 Elephant Theatre Company
 Elkay Apartments
 Elysian Park
 Emerson Middle School
 Encino Oak Tree
 Ennis House
 Equitable Life Building
 Estrada Courts
 Eugene W. Britt House *
 Evergreen Cemetery
 Exposition Park (south of Downtown)
 Exposition Park Rose Garden *

F 

 The Forum (Inglewood)
 Faith Bible Church
 Farmers Market (3rd St. & Fairfax)
 Fashion District
 Fashion Institute of Design & Merchandising
 Federal Correctional Institution, Terminal Island
 Federal Reserve Bank of San Francisco, Los Angeles Branch
 Felipe De Neve Branch *
 Figueroa Street Tunnels
 First Church of Christ, Scientist (Long Beach)
 First Church of Christ, Scientist * (Los Angeles)
 Flower District
 Forest Lawn Glendale
 Forest Lawn Hollywood
 Fort MacArthur *
 Fox Bruin Theater
 Fox Village Theater
 Fred C. Nelles Youth Correctional Facility
 Frederick Mitchell Mooers House *

G 

 The Gamble House
 The Garber House
 Gardena Willows Wetland Preserve
 Garfield Building *
 Geffen Playhouse
 General Petroleum Building *
 General William J. Fox Airfield
 George R. Kress House *
 Gerry Building *
 Getty Center
 Glassell Park Elementary School *
 Golden Gate Theater *
 Golden State Mutual Life Insurance Building *
 The Grammy Museum
 The Granada Buildings *
 Grand Central Market
 Grand Park
 Grauman's Chinese Theater (Hollywood)
 Grauman's Egyptian Theatre
 Great Wall of Los Angeles
 The Greek Theatre
 Greystone Mansion
 Griffith Observatory (Griffith Park)
 Griffith Park
 Griffith Park Zoo
 The Grove
 Guaranty Building *

H 

 The Haas Building
 Hale House *
 Hammer Museum
 Hancock Park
 The Hat
 Heinsbergen Decorating Company Building *
 Heritage Square Museum
 Highland Avenue palm trees
 Highland-Camrose Bungalow Village *
 Highland Park
 Historic Filipinotown
 Holiday Bowl
 Hollenbeck Park
 Hollywood and Highland Center
 Hollywood and Vine
 Hollywood Bowl (Hollywood)
 Hollywood Center Studios
 Hollywood Forever Cemetery
 Hollywood Heritage Museum
 Hollywood High School *
 Hollywood Melrose Hotel *
 Hollywood Museum
 Hollywood Post Office *
 Hollywood Reservoir
 Hollywood Roosevelt Hotel
 Hollywood Sign
 Hollywood Walk of Fame (Hollywood)
 Holmes-Shannon House *
 Hotel Alexandria
 Hotel Café
 Hotel Chancellor *
 Hsi Lai Temple
 Huntington Library (San Marino)
 Hyde Park Congregational Church

I 
 Inglewood Park Cemetery

J 

 Japanese American National Museum (Downtown)
 The Japanese Garden
 Jardinette Apartments *
 Jet Propulsion Laboratory (Pasadena)
 Jewelry District
 John Sowden House
 Johnie's Coffee Shop
 Judson Studios *
 Jumbo's Clown Room

K 

 Kelton Apartments
 Knott's Berry Farm
 Korean Bell of Friendship
 Koreatown (near Mid-Center)
 Kronish House

L 

 L.A. Live
 La Brea Tar Pits (Miracle Mile)
 Lafayette Park
 Landfair Apartments
 Lassen Street Olive Trees
 Laurel Canyon
 Leimert Park
 The Leo Magnus Cricket Complex
 Leonis Adobe *
 Levitated Mass
 Lincoln Heights Branch Library *
 Little Armenia
 Little Ethiopia
 Little India (Artesia)
 Little Tokyo * (Downtown)
 Llano del Rio
 Long Beach main post office *
 Los Angeles Air Force Base
 Los Angeles Aqueduct
 Los Angeles Central Library
 Los Angeles City Hall (Downtown)
 Los Angeles Convention Center
 Los Angeles County Arboretum and Botanic Garden (Arcadia)
 Los Angeles County Coroner's Office
 Los Angeles County Museum of Art (LACMA) (Miracle Mile)
 Los Angeles Fire Department Museum and Memorial *
 Los Angeles International Airport (LAX) (Westchester, Los Angeles)
 Los Angeles Memorial Coliseum (south of Downtown)
 Los Angeles Nurses' Club *
 Los Angeles River bicycle path
 Los Angeles State Historic Park
 Los Angeles Zoo (Griffith Park)
 Los Encinos State Historic Park
 Lovell House *
 Lummis House
 Lydecker House

M 

 Macarthur Park (Westlake)
 Machine Project
 Madrona Marsh
 The Magic Castle
 Malibou Lake
 Malibu Creek
 Malibu Lagoon State Beach
 Mariachi Plaza
 Marina del Rey
 Mark Taper Forum
 Marvin Braude Mulholland Gateway Park
 Mary Andrews Clark Memorial Home *
 Mayan Theater
 Memorial Branch *
 Mildred E. Mathias Botanical Garden
 Minnie Hill Palmer House *
 Miracle Mile (West of Downtown, Wilshire Boulevard)
 Mission San Fernando Rey de España
 Mission San Gabriel Arcángel
 Mitsuwa Marketplace
 Montebello Genocide Memorial
 Mount Wilson Observatory
 Mulholland Drive
 Mulholland Highway
 Municipal Warehouse No. 1 *
 Museum of Contemporary Art
 Museum of Jurassic Technology
 Museum of Tolerance (West Los Angeles)
 Music Center
 Musso & Frank Grill

N 

 Natural History Museum of Los Angeles County *
 Nethercutt Collection
 Neutra Office Building *
 NoHo Arts District
 Norms Restaurants
 Norton Simon Museum
 Nuart Theatre

O 

 Odd Fellows Cemetery
 Old Bank District
 Old Plaza Firehouse
 Old Santa Susana Stage Road *
 Old Town Pasadena
 Old Warner Brothers Studio *
 Oldest McDonald's restaurant (Downey) *
 Olvera Street (Downtown)
 O'Melveny Park
 Open Fist Theatre Company
 Orcutt Ranch Horticulture Center
 Original Tommy's
 Orpheum Theatre
 Owlwood Estate

P 

 Pacific Asia Museum (Pasadena)
 Pacific Electric Railroad Bridge (Torrance) *
 Pacoima Dam
 Pann's
 Pantages Theatre
 The Pantry
 Paradox Iron Brewery
 Paramount Studios
 Park Plaza Hotel
 Pasadena Museum of California Art
 Pasadena Museum of History
 Pasadena Playhouse
 Peck Park
 Pellissier Building *
 Pershing Square
 Petersen Automotive Museum (Miracle Mile, Los Angeles)
 Petitfils-Boos House *
 Philippe's
 Pink's Hot Dogs
 Pio Pico State Historic Park
 Playa del Rey
 Plummer Park
 Point Dume
 Point Fermin Light *
 Point Mugu State Park
 Pomona Envisions the Future
 Port of Los Angeles
 Portal of the Folded Wings Shrine to Aviation *

R 

 RMS Queen Mary (Long Beach)
 Rainbow Bar and Grill
 Ralph J. Bunche House *
 Ralph J. Scott (fireboat) *
 Randy's Donuts (Inglewood)
 RAT Beach
 The Ravenswood
 Red Men Hall
 Ren-Mar Studios
 Rindge House *
 Rio de Los Angeles State Park
 Robert Morton Organ Company
 The Rock Store
 Rocky Peak
 Rodeo Drive (Beverly Hills)
 Rodeo Drive Walk of Style
 Roosevelt Building *
 Roscoe's House of Chicken and Waffles
 Rose Bowl
 The Roxy Theatre
 Royce Hall
 Runyon Canyon Park

S 

 St. Andrews Bungalow Court *
 St. Vincent de Paul Church
 Salazar Park
 Samuel Freeman House *
 San Fernando Building *
 San Fernando Mission Cemetery
 San Fernando Pioneer Memorial Cemetery
 San Pedro Municipal Ferry Building *
 San Pedro post office *
 Santa Anita Dam
 Santa Anita Park
 Santa Catalina Island
 Santa Monica Looff Hippodrome *
 Santa Monica Pier (Santa Monica)
 Santa Monica State Beach
 Santa Susana Field Laboratory
 Sears, Roebuck Building *
 Second Church of Christ, Scientist *
 Security Trust and Savings *
 Self Help Graphics & Art
 Self-Realization Fellowship Lake Shrine
 Sepulveda Dam
 Sepulveda Pass
 Shakespeare Bridge
 Sheats Goldstein Residence
 Ships Coffee Shop
 Shrine Auditorium *
 Silver Lake Reservoir
 Sinai Temple
 Six Flags Magic Mountain
 Skid Row
 Smith Estate *
 SoFi Stadium
 Sound City Studios
 South Park Lofts *
 Southern California Gas Company Complex *
 Southwest Museum
  *
 Stahl House *
 Staples Center (Downtown)
 Stephen S. Wise Temple
 Stoney Point (Chatsworth)
 Strathmore Apartments
 Streetcar Depot, West Los Angeles *
 Sunset Junction
 Sunset Strip
 Sunset Tower
 Susana Machado Bernard House and Barn *

T 

 Tam O'Shanter Inn
 Television City
 Temple Beth Israel (Highland Park)
 Terminal Annex *
 Thai Town (Hollywood)
 Theatre Row Hollywood
 Theme Building (at LAX)
 Theodore Payne Foundation
 Thien Hau Temple (Chinatown)
 Third Street Promenade (Santa Monica)
 Tiffany Theater
 Tiki Ti
 Tillman Water Reclamation Plant
 Title Guarantee and Trust Company Building *
 Tom Bergin's
 Topanga Canyon
 Tower of Wooden Pallets
 The Town House *
 Toy District
 Travel Town Museum (Griffith Park)
 Triforium
 The Troubadour

U 
 Union Station (Downtown)
 Universal CityWalk
 Universal Studios (Universal City)
 University of California, Los Angeles (UCLA)
 University of Southern California (USC)
 Upper Las Virgenes Canyon Open Space Preserve
 Urban Light
 U.S. Bank Tower (Downtown)
 USS Iowa Museum (San Pedro/Port of Los Angeles)

V 

 Van de Kamp Bakery Building
 Van Nuys Branch of the Los Angeles Public Library *
 Vasquez Rocks *
 Venice Beach boardwalk
 Venice Branch Library
 Venice canals
 Venice of America House *
 Verdugo Hills Cemetery
 Villa Bonita *
 Vincent Thomas Bridge
 The Viper Room
 Vista Theatre
 Vroman's Bookstore (Pasadena)

W 

 Walt Disney Concert Hall
 Warner Center (Woodland Hills)
 Warren Wilson Beach House *
 Watts Station *
 Watts Towers *
 Wells Fargo Center
 Westlake Theatre *
 Westwood Village Memorial Park Cemetery
 Whisky a Go Go
 Whitley Heights
 Whittier Narrows
 Wilkins House
 Will Rogers State Beach
 Will Rogers State Historic Park *
 Wilmington Branch *
 Wilshire Boulevard Temple *
 Wilshire Branch *
 Wilshire Federal Building
 Wilshire Ward Chapel
 Wiltern Theatre *
 Woman's Building
 Woodley Park

Y 
 Young's Market Company Building *

Z 

 Zamperini Field
 Zanja Madre
 Zankou Chicken
 Zen Center of Los Angeles
 Ziegler Estate *
 Zuma Beach

See also
Los Angeles City Museums
National Register of Historic Places listings in California
Los Angeles City Guide

 
Interest
Los Angeles
Sites
 
Los Angeles Area